Collegeville is an unincorporated community in St. Wendel Township, Stearns County, Minnesota, United States, near St. Joseph.  The community is located near the junction of Collegeville Road and Old Collegeville Road. Nearby is Saint John's Abbey, a large Benedictine monastery.

History
The community was named for Saint John's University.

Geography
Collegeville is located within section 32 of St. Wendel Township.  Collegeville Township lies to the southwest.

References

Unincorporated communities in Stearns County, Minnesota
Unincorporated communities in Minnesota